Berjaya Hills Resort (formerly Bukit Tinggi Resort) is a hill resort in Bukit Tinggi, Bentong District, Pahang, Malaysia. It is known for its French-themed village, Colmar Tropicale.

References

External links
Berjaya Hills Resort website
Arabian Indian Belle Dance in Berjaya Hills

Berjaya Corporation
Resorts in Malaysia
Buildings and structures in Pahang
Tourist attractions in Pahang